Pure FM is the call sign for Portsmouth University Radio Experience, the student-led radio station for the University of Portsmouth. As a student media of the University of Portsmouth Students' Union, the station is supported by the union and is housed within the Student Centre on Cambridge Road.

History 

Pure FM was launched in 1994.

Awards 

In 2008 at the Student Radio Association Conference in Bath, Ben Burrell won the very first ever Demo Idol.

In 2012, Dan Jackson and Murray Grindon were shortlisted for the Best Entertainment Programming category at the Student Radio Awards.

In April 2013 at the Student Radio Association Conference in Leicester, Glen Scott picked up Volunteer of the Year at the I Love Student Radio Awards.

In November 2013, Glen Scott picked up the Gold Award for Best Male Presenter at the National Student Radio Awards 2013.

In 2014 at the National Student Radio Awards, Pure FM picked up their first group Gold Award for Best SRA Chart Show (presented by Glen Scott and Oliver Ing, produced by Ed Roberts).

In 2015, at the National Student Radio Awards Pure FM were shortlisted for Best SRA Chart Show (presented by Orion Brooks and Andrew Dixson, produced by Kerrie Oak and Alex Watson).

In 2016, Pure FM were nominated for "Most Improved Student Radio Station" at the I Love Student Radio Awards. Deputy Head of Music, Nelson Hylton, was also nominated for Outstanding Contribution to Student Radio.

Notable alumni 
Some of the most well known alumni of Pure FM include:
 Christian Williams - Presenter at Capital FM
 Fred Bradley - Previous Chair of Student Radio Association
 Glen Scott - Presenter at KMFM
 Ben Burrell - Presenter at Absolute Radio

References

External links 
Pure FM 
 https://soundcloud.com/purefmportsmouth

Radio stations in Hampshire
Student radio in the United Kingdom
University of Portsmouth